The Rio de Canjambari is a river which flows through the Oio Region of Guinea-Bissau. It is a tributary of the Farim River.

Rivers of Guinea-Bissau
Oio Region